Alejandro Tomás Foxley Rioseco (born 26 May 1939 in Viña del Mar) is a Chilean economist and politician. He was the Foreign Minister of Chile from 2006  to 2009 and previously served as Minister of Finance from 1990 to 1994 and leader of the Christian Democrat Party from 1994 to 1996.

Education and personal life
Foxley received a Chemical Engineering degree from the Catholic University of Valparaíso and PhD in Economics from the University of Wisconsin–Madison. Over his life he has received various awards including three honorary doctorates, the Great Insignia of Honor from Austria, the Ordem Nacional Cruzeiro do Sul from Brazil and the Order of Civil Merit from the King of Spain.

Foxley is married to Gisela Tapia Soko with two children and four grandchildren.

Economist and writer
Foxley has taught at various universities including the University of Sussex in 1973, Oxford University in 1975, Massachusetts Institute of Technology in 1978, University of California, Berkeley in 1981, University of California, San Diego in 1985 and the University of Notre Dame. He has written thirteen books on economics and the problems of democracy.

Political career
Foxley was appointed to the first Chilean cabinet after the restoration of democracy by Patricio Aylwin. He served as Minister of Finance from 1990 to 1994 and is regarded as one of the architects of the strong economic growth of the period. As Finance Minister he was also a governor of the Inter-American Development Bank and the World Bank. Following his period as Finance Minister Foxley was elected leader of the Christian Democrat Party in 1994, serving until 1996.

In 1998 Foxley was elected a member of the Senate of Chile for Santiago East. In the Senate he was the Chairman of the Finance Committee for four years until he stood down from the Senate in 2006. During his period in the Senate he was seen as a possible Presidential candidate but backed the candidacy of Michelle Bachelet in the Presidential election. Bachelet appointed him as Foreign Minister in March 2006 following her victory in the election. In March 2009 Foxley resigned as Foreign Minister for personal reasons and to pursue other interests. Today he is a member of Washington D.C. based think tank, the Inter-American Dialogue.

References

External links

CV of Alejandro Foxley

Living people
1939 births
Academics of the University of Sussex
Candidates for President of Chile
20th-century Chilean economists
Chilean Ministers of Finance
Chilean people of English descent
Christian Democratic Party (Chile) politicians
Foreign ministers of Chile
Massachusetts Institute of Technology faculty
Members of the Inter-American Dialogue
People from Viña del Mar
Pontifical Catholic University of Valparaíso alumni
University of California, Berkeley faculty
University of California, San Diego faculty
University of Notre Dame faculty
University of Wisconsin–Madison College of Letters and Science alumni